Eucalyptus houseana, commonly known as Kimberley white gum, or  is a species of medium-sized tree that is endemic to the Kimberley region of Western Australia. It has smooth bark, lance-shaped adult leaves, flower buds in groups of seven, white flowers and conical to hemispherical fruit.

Description
It has smooth bark, pale pink at first, white to grey and powdery later. Young plants and coppice regrowth have stems that are more or less square in cross section and sessile leaves arranged in opposite pairs. Flowering occurs between July and November and the flowers are white.

Taxonomy and naming
The name Eucalyptus houseana first appeared in the Western Mail newspaper on 2 June 1906. The article was written by William Vincent Fitzgerald who noted that it "is among the tallest of the tropical species, it occasionally reaching a height of 80ft", giving a short note on its distribution and mentioning "Dr. F. M. House". The first formal description of the species was published in 1916 by was by Joseph Maiden, giving credit for the name to Fitzgerald. The description was published in Journal and Proceedings of the Royal Society of New South Wales.
The specific epithet honours the doctor and explorer Frederick Maurice House.

Distribution and habitat
Kimberley white gum is found along swampy river flats in forest and woodland throughout the western Kimberley region where it grows in sandy alluvium.

See also
List of Eucalyptus species

References

Eucalypts of Western Australia
Trees of Australia
houseana
Myrtales of Australia
Plants described in 1916
Taxa named by William Vincent Fitzgerald